Senator McLaughlin may refer to:

Edward F. McLaughlin (1883–1953), Massachusetts State Senate
Joseph R. McLaughlin (Michigan politician) (1851–1932), Michigan State Senate
Thomas McLaughlin (politician) (1878/1879–1944), Northern Irish Senate